Koelreuteria paniculata is a species of flowering plant in the family Sapindaceae, native to eastern Asia (China and Korea). It was introduced in Europe in 1747, and to America in 1763, and has become a popular landscape tree worldwide. Common names include goldenrain tree, pride of India, China tree, and the varnish tree.

Description

The fruit is a three-part inflated bladderlike pod, 3–6 cm long and 2–4 cm broad, that is green, then ripening from orange to pink in autumn. It contains several dark brown to black seeds 5–8 mm diameter.

There are several varieties:
K. paniculata var. paniculata. Northern China and Korea. Leaves single-pinnate.
K. paniculata var. apiculata (Rehder & E.H.Wilson) Rehder (syn. K. apiculata). Western China (Sichuan), intergrading with var. paniculata in central China. Leaves with larger leaflets commonly bipinnate.
K. paniculata var. fastigiata. Small growing columnar form originated in 1888.
K. paniculata var. variegata. a form with variegated foliage.

Cultivation
It is popularly grown as an ornamental tree in temperate regions all across the world because of the aesthetic appeal of its flowers, leaves and seed pods. Several cultivars have been selected for garden planting, including 'Fastigiata' with a narrow crown, and 'September Gold', flowering in late summer.

In the UK the cultivar ‘Coral Sun’ has gained the Royal Horticultural Society's Award of Garden Merit.

In some areas, notably the eastern United States and particularly in Florida, it is considered an invasive species.

Gallery

Notes

References
Plants for a Future: Koelreuteria paniculata
Koelreuteria paniculata images at bioimages.vanderbilt.edu

External links 

 Dosmann, Michael S., Whitlow, Thomas H., and Ho-Duck, Kang. "The (un)Natural and Cultural History of Korean Goldenrain Tree." Arnoldia 64 (1) (2006).
 Santamour, Frank S.and Spongberg, Stephen A. "’Rose Lantern’: A New Cultivar of Koelreuteria paniculata, the Golden-Rain Tree." Arnoldia 56 (2) (1996). 

Sapindaceae
Trees of China
Trees of Korea